Helen is a 2008 drama film by Desperate Optimists, (Joe Lawlor and Christine Molloy), and was the first feature film made through their production company Desperate Optimists Productions. It is often spoken of as an expansion or companion piece to their short film Joy.

Plot
Helen stars Annie Townsend as a teenage girl who, when asked by the police to play the stand-in for a reconstruction, realizes it gives her a chance to confront her own troubled past.

Cast
Annie Townsend as Helen
Dennis Jobling as Mr Thompson
Sandie Malia as Mrs Thompson
Danny Groenland as Danny

Release
Helen played in over 50 film festivals and was distributed across the UK in 2009 by New Wave.

Reception
Helen was acclaimed by critics such as Jonathan Romney in The Independent and Philip French in The Observer who wrote: 'With echoes of Antonioni and Bresson, the story of a young woman's disappearance is one of the most remarkable British debuts of recent years. Despite some misgivings on this first feature, Peter Bradshaw in The Guardian lauded the filmmakers as 'real talents with a distinctive, if evolving, film-making language of their own.'

Critic and writer Sophie Mayer highlighted a mythic quality to the film, something which has also been mentioned in relation to Desperate Optimist's more recent Rose Plays Julie. She writes: 'Given the film's title and protagonist, it seems unlikely that Desperate Optimists weren't thinking, at least a little, about the most famous Helen in history. Rather than the story of Troy, or the Helen who tempts Faust, they rediscover - in a thrilling comment on cinema's star system and the viewer's desire to both desire and believe - the eidolon, a woman always performing her fragmented self.'

References

External links

British drama films
Films shot in the United Kingdom
2000s English-language films
2000s British films